Katherine Forbes may refer to:

Kathryn Forbes (1908–1966), American writer
Katherine Stewart Forbes (1818 ship), barque that carried convicts to Australia and migrants to New Zealand

See also
Cathi Forbes, member of the Maryland House of Delegates
Cathy Forbes (disambiguation)
 Dame Katherine Trefusis-Forbes (1899–1971), Air Chief Commandant